This article lists various career, tournament, and seasonal achievements by the Spanish tennis player Rafael Nadal.

Rafael Nadal has won an all-time record 22 Grand Slam men’s singles titles, jointly shared with Novak Djokovic.

Nadal has contested a milestone 30 Grand Slam finals in his career, which is third to Djokovic's 33 and Roger Federer's 31 finals appearances, respectively. He has appeared in at least five finals at each major (second to Djokovic's six) and is the only man to win multiple majors in three separate decades. Nadal won at least one major for 10 consecutive years (2005–2014) and 15 individual years overall, both all-time records in men's tennis. He holds the record for most titles at three ATP Tour levels: Grand Slam Tournaments (French Open - 14), Masters 1000 (Monte Carlo - 11), and ATP 500 (Barcelona - 12). Nadal has won 92 ATP titles in his career, including 36 Masters titles. After winning the 2022 Australian Open, he became the fourth man in history (joining Roy Emerson, Rod Laver, and Djokovic) to win all four majors at least two times in his career (Double Career Grand Slam). Nadal is the only man in history to complete the Career Grand Slam and win an Olympic gold medal in both singles and doubles.

Known as the "King of Clay", Nadal won the French Open nine times in his first 10 attempts. He has won the event 14 times overall, with a match record of 112–3 (97.4% win rate), which is viewed by many analysts as one of the greatest feats in tennis and world sport. Nadal's dominance on the surface is further accentuated by his unique feat of winning the three clay-court Masters 1000 tournaments (Monte Carlo, Madrid, Rome) and the French Open in the same season (2010), thus becoming the only player to complete the Clay Slam. Nadal won the French Open on his first attempt as a 19-year-old in 2005 and went on to win four consecutive crowns from 2005 to 2008, defeating then-world-No. 1 Roger Federer in three consecutive finals from 2006 to 2008 and again in the 2011 final. To date, Nadal is the only player to defeat Federer in four finals at the same major. Nadal is also the only player to beat Federer in the finals of three different Grand Slam tournaments — the French Open, the Australian Open, and Wimbledon). Having faced his first of three career-losses at the French Open against Robin Söderling in 2009, he would go on to win five consecutive titles from 2010 to 2014. Nadal furthered his place in history by achieving "La Decima" — a 10th title at the 2017 French Open, where he did not drop a set and lost only 35 games (only three shy of Björn Borg's record of 32 games lost). He would then go on to win four consecutive crowns from 2017 to 2020 and another in 2022, making Nadal the only player, male or female, to win 14 titles at a single Grand Slam tournament in tennis history. Additionally, his 2020 French Open win also made Nadal the only player in history to have three streaks of four consecutive titles at a major, as well as three streaks of 30+ consecutive match wins at the same major. He has never been taken to five sets in the final of the French Open, and is the only player to achieve this level of dominance at a single major. Additionally, Nadal is 137–3 in best of five matches on clay (a win percentage of 97.9%). Nadal did not lose a single semifinal on clay courts for 12 years (52–0) from the 2003 Croatia Open to the 2015 Rio Open — an all-time record on a single surface. He holds the record for the longest single surface win streak in the Open Era, having won 81 consecutive matches on clay courts from 2005 to 2007. Nadal also holds the Open Era record for the most consecutive sets won on a single surface (50 on clay). On clay, he has won an all-time record 14 majors, a record 26 Masters 1000 titles, and an Open Era record 63 titles overall. Nadal has won an all-time record 11 titles at the Monte Carlo Masters, including an Open Era record streak of eight consecutive titles from 2005 to 2012 and three consecutive titles from 2016 to 2018. He has also won an all-time record 10 titles at the Rome Masters.

Nadal's profound success in the sport is not limited to clay courts. Over the course of his career, he has won 514 matches on hard courts (4th in the Open Era behind Federer, Djokovic, and Andre Agassi). He is the only player, male or female, to have recorded 470+ match wins on both hard and clay courts. He has won six hard-court Grand Slam titles (4th all-time behind Djokovic, Federer, and Pete Sampras). He has won each major multiple times on clay, hard, and grass courts. He has won two Australian Open (hard), two Wimbledon (grass), and four US Open (hard) titles. Nadal is the first Spaniard to win the Australian Open and the second to win Wimbledon. In 2008, he became only the third player in the Open Era, after Rod Laver (1969) and Björn Borg (1980), to win the French Open and Wimbledon crowns in a calendar year (Channel Slam), a feat he repeated in 2010. He is the only male player in tennis history to win the French Open and the US Open in a calendar year on four occasions (2010, 2013, 2017, 2019). Nadal won the Olympic singles gold medal in Beijing (2008) and the Olympic doubles gold medal in Rio de Janeiro (2016) on hard courts. He has won 10 Masters 1000 titles at hard court events — five in Canada, three in Indian Wells, one in Cincinnati, and one in Madrid indoors). Nadal dominated the North American hard court season in 2013, having already won the Indian Wells title earlier in the year, he would go on to win 26 consecutive matches on hard courts by winning the Canadian Masters, Cincinnati Masters as well as the US Open, thus joining Patrick Rafter (1998) and Andy Roddick (2003) in completing the Summer Slam.

Nadal has been ranked world No.1 for 209 weeks by the ATP, and has finished as the year-end No. 1 five times (2008, 2010, 2013, 2017, and 2019). He is the only man to have been ranked world No. 1 in three decades (2000s, 2010s, and 2020s). He is the first man to finish as the year-end No. 1 twice after turning 30 years old (2017 and 2019), and holds the record for the longest gap between his first (2008) and latest (2019) year-end No. 1 finishes (11 years). He is the only male player to regain the year-end No. 1 crown four times and finish as the year-end No. 1 in five non-consecutive years. He also has the most wins against world No. 1 ranked players, with 23 in total. He appeared in the Top 10 of the ATP rankings consecutively from April 2005 to March 2023 – the longest rankings streak in the history of men's tennis (912 weeks). Nadal qualified for the Year-End Championships for a record 16 consecutive years from 2005 to 2020.

Nadal also holds the Open Era records for the most consecutive years winning at least one ATP singles title (19 years from 2004–2022) and at least two ATP singles titles (18 years from 2005–2022). Nadal ranks first in the Open Era for the highest clay court match-winning percentage (minimum 100 wins) at 91.3% (474–45 record), and the highest outdoor match-winning percentage (minimum 200 wins) at 84.8% (973–174).

All time tournament records
 These records were attained since the amateur era (1877) and the Open Era of tennis (1968).
 Records in italics are currently active streaks.

Grand Slam tournament records
 These records were attained in the Open Era of tennis, since 1968.
 Records in italics are currently active streaks.

Records at each Grand Slam tournament 
 These records were attained in the Open Era of tennis, since 1968.
 Records in italics are currently active streaks.

 Nadal is the first player in history to win 14 titles at the same major.
 Nadal is the first player in history to be undefeated in at least the first 10 Grand Slam finals at the same major – he holds a 14–0 record in French Open finals. Only other player in history to have remained undefeated in at least 10 Grand Slam finals is Novak Djokovic, with a 10–0 record at the Australian Open.

ATP Masters records 
 Grand Prix Championship Series began in 1970.
 ATP Championship Series was introduced in 1990.
 Renamed to ATP Tour Masters 1000 in 2019.

 Andy Murray accomplished this feat at the Australian Open by finishing as the runner-up five times without winning a title.
 Novak Djokovic also reached the quarter-finals, or better, in all 9 Masters 1000 events of the year in 2009. They met in 5 out of the 9 tournaments with Nadal winning 3 matches & Djokovic winning the other 2 matches. Nadal prevailed in the Monte Carlo final, Madrid semifinal, and Rome final, while Djokovic bested him in the Cincinnati semifinal, and Paris semifinal, where he would go on to win the title.

Records at each ATP 500 Series & ATP Masters 1000 tournaments 

 Nadal was the first player to win 25 Masters titles in the Open Era, he surpassed Ivan Lendl's record of 22 in 2013. Nadal was also the first player to win 35 ATP Masters titles, which he achieved in 2019.

Rankings records and achievements 
 The ATP ranking was frozen from 23 March to 23 August 2020

Other significant records 

 The only player to have lost just one game in an ATP Masters 1000 final (Monte Carlo 2010: 6–0, 6–1).
 The fastest to win ATP Masters Titles (since winning the first title): 5 titles: 8 tournaments/1 year: Monte Carlo 2005 – Monte Carlo 200610 titles: 24 tournaments/3 years: Monte Carlo 2005 – Monte Carlo 200815 titles: 34 tournaments/4 years: Monte Carlo 2005 – Rome 200920 titles: 58 tournaments/7 years: Monte Carlo 2005 – Monte Carlo 201225 titles: 65 tournaments/8 years: Monte Carlo 2005 – Montreal 2013

Guinness World Records
As of 2023, Nadal holds 22 Guinness World Records.
 Most Grand Slam singles tennis titles won (Male) - 22 with Novak Djokovic
 Most titles of one Grand Slam singles tennis tournament - 14 at French Open
 Most French Open singles tennis titles won by a man - 14
 Most wins of one Grand Slam singles tennis tournament (Open Era) - 14 at French Open
 Most wins of one Grand Slam singles tennis tournament (Open Era, male) - 14 at French Open
 Most singles finals played at one Grand Slam tennis tournament (Open Era) - 14 at French Open
 Most wins of one singles tennis tournament (Open Era) - 14 at French Open
 Most consecutive French Open singles tennis titles won by a man - 5
 Most consecutive Grand Slam singles final losses by a man - 3
 First player to win 10 singles titles at the same Grand Slam (Open Era)
 First player to win 10 singles titles at the same ATP World Tour event (Open Era) - 11 at Monte-Carlo Masters
 Youngest man to win a tennis Career Grand Slam - 
 Most men’s ATP titles won outdoors - 90
 Most years winning an ATP title - 19
 Most consecutive years winning an ATP title - 19
 Most clay-court singles titles (Open Era) - 63
 Most tennis singles matches on clay won consecutively (Male) - 81
 Most consecutive sets won on a single surface - 50 on clay
 First players to win all four tennis Grand Slams together - 2013 with Serena Williams
 Longest Grand Slam tennis final - with Novak Djokovic at the 2012 Australian Open
 Most ATP Tour singles matches between two players (Open Era) - 59 with Novak Djokovic
 Most tennis Grand Slam meetings (Singles) - 18 with Novak Djokovic

Wins over No. 1 players 

Nadal holds the record for most wins against No. 1-ranked players, 23. With his win in the final of the 2019 Italian Open – Men's Singles over Djokovic, he broke a long-standing tie with Boris Becker. He recorded 13 wins over Roger Federer and 10 wins over Novak Djokovic. Nadal recorded his first win over a No. 1-ranked player when he was only , and ranked No. 34, when he beat Federer in straight sets in the third round of the 2004 Miami Open.

Awards
This is a list of awards Spanish tennis player Rafael Nadal has won in his career.

 ATP Player of the Year† (5): 2008, 2010, 2013, 2017, 2019
 ITF World Champion (5): 2008, 2010, 2017, 2019, 2022
 Davis Cup Most Valuable Player: 2019
 Laureus World Sports Award for Breakthrough of the Year: 2006
 Laureus World Sports Award for Sportsman of the Year (2): 2011, 2021
 Laureus World Sports Award for Comeback of the Year: 2014
 Best Male Tennis Player ESPY Award (3): 2011, 2014, 2022
 L'Équipe Champion of Champions (4): 2010, 2013, 2017, 2019
 US Open Series Champion (2): 2008, 2013
 One of two men, alongside Roger Federer, to win the Series and the US Open in the same year.
 One of three men, alongside Andy Roddick and Andy Murray, to win the Series two times.
 ATP Newcomer of the Year†: 2003
 ATP Most Improved Player†: 2005
 Stefan Edberg Sportsmanship Award†  (5): 2010, 2018, 2019, 2020, 2021
 Arthur Ashe Humanitarian of the Year†: 2011
 ATP Comeback Player of the Year†: 2013
 ATP Fan's Favourite†: 2022
 European Sportsperson of the Year (2): 2008, 2010
 BBC Sports Personality World Sport Star of the Year: 2010
 Esquire Man of the Year: 2022
 Marca Legend Award: 2008
 Marca 75th Anniversary Legend Award: 2013
 Diario AS Sports Award (6): 2010, 2017, 2020, 2022
 Spanish National Sports Awards (3): 2006, 2008, 2017
 Princess of Asturias Award: 2008
 Medal of the City of Paris: 2015
 Gold Medal of Merit in Labour: 2015
 Guardia Civil Silver Medal for Merit: 2019
 Grand Cross of the Royal Order of Sports Merit: 2020
 Grand Cross of the Order of Dos De Mayo: 2020
 Grand Cross of Naval Merit: 2022
 Instituto Franklin-UAH Camino Real Award: 2022

† – Nadal is the only man to win every ATP award in the player category.

See also
List of career achievements by Roger Federer
List of career achievements by Novak Djokovic
List of career achievements by Andy Murray

Notes

References

achievements
Nadal, Rafael